King Daoxiang of Zhao (died 236 BC, reigned 244 BC – 236 BC) reigned in the State of Zhao during the Warring States period of Chinese history.

Born as Zhao Yan to King Xiaocheng of Zhao, he was originally not groomed to succeed to the throne. However, his path to the throne was eased by the circumstances. Firstly, the heir to the Zhao throne was required to spend a large portion of his youth as a hostage in the Qin court – thus making him susceptible to court intrigue. Secondly, the minister Guo Kai was intent on making Zhao Yan the next king. Therefore, when King Xiaocheng died, instead of welcoming the rightful heir back to Handan, Guo Kai proclaimed Zhao Yan as king instead. The famous Zhao general Lian Po objected to this state of affairs and resigned his posts as a result.

King Daoxiang's rule saw Zhao engage in warfare with its eastern neighbour, Yan. Under the command of general Li Mu, Zhao initiated two successful campaigns against Yan in 244 BC and 235 BC, gaining land in what is now central Hebei.

Zhao Daoxiang died in 236 BC, in the midst of a Qin invasion of Zhao and was succeeded by King Youmiu.

Family 
Daoxiang's oldest son, Jia, was the son of his first wife, whose name is unknown. Jia was initially heir apparent. However the "Songstress Queen", Zhao Mianchang, a consort from Handan, entered the court as a concubine and gave birth to a son, Qian, later King Youmiu of Zhao. Zhao Mianchang allegedly slandered both the queen and Prince Jia, and arranged for someone to offend Jia to provoke him into committing a crime. After Jia had lost favour with Daoxiang, Qian was established as the new heir apparent and Zhao Mianchang was installed as the new queen.

Popular culture
King Daoxiang appears in manga and anime series Kingdom.

References 

Monarchs of Zhao (state)
Year of birth unknown
230s BC deaths
Chinese kings
3rd-century BC Chinese monarchs
Zhou dynasty nobility
Zhao (state)